Secret and Whisper (often typeset as Secret & Whisper) is a post-hardcore band from Kelowna, British Columbia, Canada. Secret and Whisper formed after the band Stutterfly replaced their departed vocalist and decided on a new name. Their first album, Great White Whale, was released on February 12, 2008. The band's first single was "XOXOXO" followed by "Warrior (Southern Arrowwood)". Their second album, Teenage Fantasy, was released on April 6, 2010.

History

Formations and Great White Whale (2007-2010)
The band, consisting of five members, was called Stutterfly until a key member, Chris Stickney, decided to leave shortly after they were dropped from Maverick Records. Stickney soon moved to a band called Oceans Apart.
The rest of the band, Bradyn Byron, Jason Ciolli, Jordan Chase and Ryan Loerke, approached Charles Finn (then named Charles Furney), a friend and former member of thebleedingalarm, who used to tour with them,  to be their new lead singer. The new line-up became Secret and Whisper on February 24, 2007. They decided to think of a new band name because of the completely different sound that Charles' voice brought to the band.

Teenage Fantasy and hiatus activities (2010-2021) 

On September 15, 2009 in a MySpace blog, Charles announced the official departure of Bradyn Byron. The band has since recruited David Ecker as guitarist.  David Ecker previously played guitar for Oceans Apart with former Stutterfly member Chris Stickney.

Teenage Fantasy's first single was "Warrior (Southern Arrowwood)". The album was released on April 6, 2010. No music video was released off the album.

On February 4, 2011, they released B-Side track "Pixie" on myspace.

On July 12, 2011, via Facebook note the band announced going on an indefinite hiatus.

Members of Secret & Whisper Jordan Chase, Ryan Loerke and David Ecker formed the band Shreddy Krueger with Chase taking over vocals duty.

In 2017-2018 Secret & Whisper posted a bunch photos on Facebook hinting reunion and some work in studio, but there were no reunion announcement and no news about their activity as a band later on.

Reunion (2022–present) 
On February 12, 2022, the 14-year anniversary of Great White Whale, Ryan Loerke stated on his Instagram post that Secret and Whisper started practicing together again with intentions to play shows and write  new material. A day later, the band revived an official band page on Instagram, where James Tyler Johnson (previously of Cry of the Afflicted) was mentioned to have taken guitar duties replacing previous band member David Ecker.

Band members
Current
 Charles "Chuk Furn" Finn – lead vocals (2007–2011, 2022)
 Jordan Chase – bass, vocals (2007–2011, 2022)
 Jason Ciolli – lead guitar (2007–2011, 2022)
 James Tyler Johnson – rhythm guitar (2022)
 Ryan Loerke – drums, percussion (2007–2011, 2022)

Former
 Bradyn Byron – rhythm guitar (2007–2009)
 David Ecker – rhythm guitar (2009–2011)

Discography

Studio albums

Singles 
 "XOXOXO" (Great White Whale)
 "Vanishings" (Great White Whale)
 "Warrior (Southern Arrowwood)" (Teenage Fantasy)

Songs on compilations 
 Canada Rocks, "XOXOXO" (CMC Distribution, 2008)
 Songs From The Penalty Box, Vol. 6, "XOXOXO" (Tooth & Nail Records, 2009)

Trivia 
 Two of the songs from their first album, "Attacker" and "You Are Familiar", were featured during televised professional Starcraft matches in Korea as introduction songs.
 Charles Furney has made a guest appearance on My Broken Hero's album "Man of Science, Man of Faith" in the song "Colours".
 Prior to the release of Teenage Fantasy Charles Furney changed his surname to Finn after finding out more about his family heritage.
 In 2012, Finn released a teaser for his upcoming low-fi solo album Don't Be Sad set to be released on October 9, 2012. Ultimately, only three songs ("Son of Rock 'n Roll", "Church Youth" and "100 Friends Living in my Mouth") off the album were released via Finn's YouTube channel for a short period of time, and later deleted.
 Charles Finn designed the album art for Don't Cry. Finn later started an Instagram account for his art under the moniker CHUK FURN.
 In 2012, Jason Ciolli joined the band Scissorkick.
 In 2017, Ryan Loerke and Dave Ecker joined a pop-punk band Count Me In and released a full-length album How's Your Heart, Kid? in 2018.
 In 2018-2020 Ryan Loerke played drums for a post-hardcore band Spiritbox which features ex-iwrestledabearonce members.
 In 2019, Ryan Loerke was featured on drums and Jordan Chase contributed to the bass on “Nothing Makes Me Happy Anymore”, the debut full length album from fellow Kelowna post-hardcore band Kitsune.
 In 2019, Charles Finn announced a new solo project named Skateboard Dinosaur. Skateboard Dinosaur music was produced and recorded by Jordan Chase and features Ryan Loerke on drums, both of Secret & Whisper. Skateboard Dinosaur released singles "Late Bloom" and "I Won't Cry" in 2020, and "Guts Noir" in 2021. On September 27, 2021, a tracklist of the debut full length album composed of 8 tracks was revealed via the project's Instagram.
In 2022, Ryan Loerke was featured on drums for metalcore band Tidebringer, formerly known as Shark Infested Daughters. Jordan Chase was also involved in the production and recording.

References

External links 
 Secret and Whisper on Myspace
 Secret and Whisper at Tooth and Nail Records
 

Musical groups from Kelowna
Musical groups established in 2007
Musical groups disestablished in 2011
Tooth & Nail Records artists
Canadian alternative rock groups
Canadian post-hardcore musical groups
Canadian Christian rock groups